Baragkhan (Barkhan) is a rural locality (a selo) in Kurumkansky District of the Republic of Buryatia, Russia. Population:

References 

Rural localities in Kurumkansky District